The Portrait of the Duke of Wellington is a painting by the Spanish artist Francisco de Goya of the British general Arthur Wellesley, 1st Duke of Wellington, during the latter's service in the Peninsular War. One of three portraits Goya painted of Wellington, it was begun in August 1812 after the subject's entry into Madrid, showing him as an earl in an all-red uniform and wearing the Peninsular Medal. The artist then modified it in 1814 to show him in full dress uniform with black gold–braided lapels and to add the Order of the Golden Fleece and Military Gold Cross with three clasps (both of which Wellington had been awarded in the interim).

Description
The painting was probably made from life, at sittings in Madrid, and painted in oils on a mahogany panel. Although a successful general, the Wellington depicted by Goya is tired from the long campaigning, having won a victory at the Battle of Salamanca on 22 July 1812 before triumphantly entering Madrid on 12 August 1812. The half-length portrait shows the subject in a three-quarter profile, facing to his right, with the head turned slightly to the left, towards the viewer. He is standing upright, with his head held high, perhaps to combat his relatively modest stature.  

The face is carefully painted, but much of the painting was done quickly, with great energy, with the military orders outlined with a few brushstrokes. In some areas, such as the eyes and mouth, the brown priming remains visible to create a stronger contrast between light and dark areas of paint.  

His uniform bears the insignia of several military orders. His left breast bears three stars: the British Order of the Bath (top, awarded in 1804), the Portuguese Order of the Tower and Sword (lower left, awarded in 1811) and the Spanish Order of San Fernando (lower right, awarded in 1812). He wears two broad sashes over his right shoulder: the pink sash of the Order of Bath over the blue sash of the Order of the Tower and Sword. Around his neck hangs the Order of the Golden Fleece (awarded in August 1812) on a red ribbon, the Military Gold Cross lying lower on longer pink and blue ribbons. Wellington was entitled to all nine gold clasps to the Military Gold Cross, but only three are shown, perhaps signifying the battles fought before the painting was started in the summer of 1812.

In 1812, Goya also completed a chalk drawing of Wellington, now held by the British Museum, and a large oil-on-canvas , which was exhibited at the Real Academia de Bellas Artes de San Fernando in Madrid in September 1812 and is now at Apsley House. X-ray analysis in the 1960 showed that the equestrian portrait has the head of Wellington added to a body painted previously, perhaps Manuel Godoy or Joseph Bonaparte.

Reception and theft
The painting was acquired by the Duke of Wellington, and came into the possession of Louisa Catherine Caton—wife of Francis D'Arcy-Osborne, 7th Duke of Leeds—and sister-in-law of Wellington's older brother Richard Wellesley, 1st Marquess Wellesley. Her first husband, Felton Hervey-Bathurst, fought with Wellington in the Iberian Peninsula, commanding the 14th Light Dragoons from 1811 to 1814, and then on Wellington's staff in the Waterloo Campaign and Wellingtons representative at the signing of the Convention of St. Cloud on 3 July 1815.  

It descended to John Osborne, 11th Duke of Leeds, by the time it was put up for auction at Sotheby's in 1961. The New York collector Charles Wrightsman bid £140,000, but the Wolfson Foundation offered £100,000 and the government added a special Treasury grant of £40,000, matching Wrightsman's bid and obtaining the painting for the National Gallery in London, where it was first put on display on 2 August 1961. It was stolen nineteen days later on 21 August 1961 by bus driver Kempton Bunton. Four years after the theft, Bunton contacted a newspaper, and through a left-luggage office at Birmingham New Street railway station, returned the painting voluntarily. Bunton confessed in July 1965 that he took the painting and its frame. Following a high-profile trial in which he was defended by Jeremy Hutchinson, QC, Bunton was found not guilty of stealing the painting, but guilty of stealing the frame.

The theft entered popular culture, as it was referenced in the 1962 James Bond film Dr. No. In the film, the painting was on display in Dr. Julius No's lair, suggesting the first Bond villain had the work stolen.
The prop painted by Ken Adam was used in the film promotion and was then stolen itself.

The story of the theft and the following trial of Bunton was dramatised in the film The Duke, directed by Roger Michell and starring Jim Broadbent and Helen Mirren, which was released in cinemas in the UK on 25 February 2022.

See also
List of works by Francisco Goya
List of heists in the United Kingdom
Portrait of Jacob de Gheyn III

References
Notes

Sources
 
  
 
 
 Equestrian Portrait of the 1st Duke of Wellington, Francisco de Goya, ArtUK
 Drawing of Arthur Wellesley, 1st Duke of Wellington, Francisco de Goya, British Museum
 Apsley House Collection, English Heritage
 "Goya's Wellington: The Duke Disappears", History Today, Volume 61 Issue 8, August 2011 
 "Goya works among Spain's lost art gems to be shown at British Museum", The Guardian, 18 September 2012

External links

1812 paintings
Duke of Wellington
Collections of the National Gallery, London
Duke of Wellington
Cultural depictions of Arthur Wellesley, 1st Duke of Wellington
Stolen works of art
Portraits of men